Pen-y-cae-mawr is small hamlet above the Wentwood Forest in Monmouthshire, Wales.

There are two farms - Cas-Troggy Farm and Penyrheol Farm. There is also a Methodist chapel on the main road. The chapel recently celebrated its 121st anniversary. Services are held on the second and fourth Sunday of the month at 3.00pm.

There are remains of a Baptist Chapel, shown on old maps as "Pen Y Well Chapel". Gravestones date back to the 18th century, and it also once had a yew tree, now destroyed.

References

Villages in Monmouthshire